Aureimonas glaciistagni is a Gram-negative, rod-shaped, aerobic and motile bacteria from the genus of Aurantimonas which has been isolated from a melt pond from Arctic sea ice.

References

Hyphomicrobiales
Bacteria described in 2015